The Childhood of a Leader may refer to:

The Childhood of a Leader, a 1939 short story by Jean-Paul Sartre
The Childhood of a Leader (film), a 2016 historical drama film by Brady Corbet with music by Scott Walker